Stella Judith Creasy (born 5 April 1977) is a British Labour and Co-operative politician who has been Member of Parliament (MP) for the London constituency of Walthamstow since 2010.

She served in the frontbench teams of Ed Miliband and Harriet Harman from 2011 to 2015. Following the Labour Party's defeat at the 2015 general election, Creasy stood in the Labour Party deputy leadership election, finishing second to Tom Watson. She was a vocal critic of former Labour leader Jeremy Corbyn and supported Owen Smith in the failed attempt to replace him in the 2016 leadership election.

Early life and career
Creasy was born on 5 April 1977 in Sutton Coldfield, and is the daughter of Corinna Frances Avril and Philip Charles Creasy, both active Labour Party members; her father is a trained opera singer and her mother a headteacher of a special needs school. Her elder brother, Matthew Henry Creasy (born 1974), is an academic. Creasy's mother described her own parents as "very aristocratic" and herself as "enormously privileged", which contributed to her decision to join the Labour Party.

After spending her early childhood in the Manchester suburb of Didsbury, her family moved to Colchester where Creasy attended Colchester County High School for Girls, a grammar school. Although she initially failed the eleven-plus exam, the Creasy family's move south gave her a second chance. In the 1990s, towards the end of John Major's period as prime minister, Creasy was an intern at the Fabian Society.

Creasy was deputy director of the Involve think tank and worked as a researcher and speech writer for various Labour government ministers, including Douglas Alexander, Charles Clarke and Ross Cranston. She then became head of public affairs at the Scout Association. In 2006, having already started work as a parliamentary researcher, she completed her thesis, receiving a doctorate in Social Psychology from the London School of Economics.  Creasy received a Titmuss Prize in 2005 for her thesis.

Political career
Elected as a councillor in Waltham Forest in 2002, Creasy served as the borough's deputy mayor and later mayor from 2002 until 2003 and for four months in 2010 prior to her election to the House of Commons. After the retirement of Labour MP, Neil Gerrard, Creasy was selected from an all-female shortlist as the party's candidate for Walthamstow, and was elected to Parliament at the 2010 general election. She supported David Miliband's bid for the Labour Party leadership in 2010.

Creasy joined Labour's frontbench team in October 2011 as Shadow Minister for Crime Prevention. She then served as Shadow Minister for Business, Innovation and Skills from October 2013 to September 2015. In 2014, she was described in a The Independent profile as "one of the brightest lights of Labour's new generation" though also as "haranguing" and "aggressive". She supported the No More Page 3 campaign to stop The Sun newspaper from publishing pictures of topless glamour models.

Creasy was re-elected at the 2015 general election with a substantially increased majority, securing a 17% increase in the share of the vote. Following the Labour Party's defeat in the election, she stood in the Labour Party deputy leadership election. She stated she was prepared to work with any of the candidates for the party leadership, including Jeremy Corbyn, saying, "that process of rebuilding isn’t about any one person it's about all of us. It's written on the back of our membership card that we achieve more together than we do alone." She gained 26% of the vote and finished second to Tom Watson. She did not back any of the final four leadership candidates. She later became a vocal critic of Corbyn and said the party under his leadership was "running on empty".  She supported Owen Smith in the failed attempt to replace Corbyn in the 2016 Labour Party leadership election. Also in 2016, she criticised Corbyn after he endorsed decriminalisation of the sex industry and accused left-wing campaign group Momentum of being more interested in "meetings and moralising" than real campaigning.

She supported Remain in the EU referendum in June 2016 and voted against the triggering of Article 50 in February 2017.

At the 2017 general election, her majority increased again, with a 12% increase in the share of the vote. She argued in September 2018 that misogyny should be made a hate crime. In June 2019, she described the culture of the Labour movement as toxic. Later that year, she was protected from a potential trigger ballot and deselection by her local party as she was on maternity leave.

Payday loans
Creasy campaigned successfully for better regulation of payday loans companies. In an article published by The Guardian, she stated that just six companies controlled lending to 90% of the seven million Britons without a bank account or credit card. She highlighted that the average cost of credit charged to these customers was 272% APR, as in the rest of Europe, and that there was a fourfold increase in payday loans since the start of the recession in 2008, which led to cross-party parliamentary support for a cap. Creasy also highlighted in a speech to the House of Commons the lack of competition in the market, leading to Government support for a cap of loans which exploit the poor, which in some cases reached 4000% APR. Creasy won The Spectator magazine's Campaigner of the Year prize in their Parliamentarian of the Year awards in 2011 for her work on the issue, and was also acknowledged by the coalition government's Chancellor George Osborne for having contributed to the government's change of policy.

In 2012, a Wonga employee used company equipment to make offensive personal attacks against Creasy. Wonga made an "immediate and unreserved apology" following these malicious attacks, and Creasy also managed to get the firm to promote one of her constituency events in aid of struggling families.

Abortion rights
Abortion law in Northern Ireland is more restrictive than elsewhere in the United Kingdom, resulting in many women travelling from Northern Ireland to Great Britain to access abortion services. In 2017, a potential amendment to the Queen's Speech, organised by Creasy, calling for the Government to allocate adequate funding for women who are forced to travel to England to have an abortion, gained cross-party support and was ultimately signed by 100 MPs, threatening a government defeat. Conservative MP Peter Bottomley was a co-signer of Creasy's amendment. In answer to a question from Bottomley in the Commons on 29 June 2017, Philip Hammond, Chancellor of the Exchequer, said the government would support free abortions on the mainland for Northern Irish women. Earlier in June, a Supreme Court ruling upheld the legal basis for a charge of £900 for women from the province seeking an abortion on the mainland, whereas other necessary treatments on the NHS would have been free. Creasy was cautious in her response to the development. "The devil will be in the detail", she said. She was reported to have received threats from some anti-abortion activists.

In June 2022, after the United States Supreme Court overturned Roe v. Wade, Creasy said that she would table an amendment to the Bill of Rights Bill which would make access to abortion a human right.

Twitter threats
At the end of July 2013, Creasy received numerous rape threats and other misogynistic messages on her Twitter timeline after expressing support for the feminist campaigner Caroline Criado Perez, who had lobbied the Bank of England to put a woman on the £10 note and received similar messages. On 2 September 2014 at the City of London Magistrates' Court, Peter Nunn was found guilty of sending menacing messages to Creasy, and was subsequently jailed for eighteen weeks.

Creasy wrote in an article published on 27 July: "Twitter tell me we should simply block those who 'offend us', as though a rape threat is matter of bad manners, not criminal behaviour." She appeared on Newsnight on 30 July 2013 with Toby Young, the Conservative commentator, over the validity of addressing harassment on the social networking site. She criticised him for a previous tweet about an MP's breasts. Young has objected to Twitter's subsequent change in policy, writing that the company, "shouldn't change its abuse policy in response to being brow-beaten by a politician".

Anti-war protests
Creasy allegedly received threats via social media following her vote for extending UK military action against ISIS to Syria after the parliamentary debate on 2 December 2015. Creasy was undecided until the day of the vote, while staff in her Walthamstow constituency office had to deal with what they referred to as harassing telephone calls. Protesters had gathered outside the closed constituency office the previous night urging a 'no' vote. On Facebook, Creasy defended their right to peaceful protest. Reports that protesters had gathered outside her home proved to be unfounded.

Maternity leave 
In May 2021, Creasy asked for maternity leave under the same conditions as Attorney General Suella Braverman, who was granted full maternity leave under the Ministerial and other Maternity Allowances Act 2021.

Personal life
Creasy's partner is Dan Fox, a former director of Labour Friends of Israel. In June 2019, she announced she was pregnant. She gave birth to a daughter in November 2019 and, after campaigning for better maternity rights for MPs, became the first MP to appoint a 'locum MP', Kizzy Gardiner, to manage constituency work. In February 2021, announcing her second pregnancy, she challenged government proposals to limit new plans for parliamentary maternity leave to government ministers.

Notes

References

External links 

 Interview by John Rentoul of Ethos Journal

1977 births
Living people
Female members of the Parliament of the United Kingdom for English constituencies
Labour Co-operative MPs for English constituencies
UK MPs 2010–2015
UK MPs 2015–2017
UK MPs 2017–2019
Councillors in the London Borough of Waltham Forest
Alumni of Magdalene College, Cambridge
Alumni of the London School of Economics
British feminists
English Anglicans
English people of Irish descent
People associated with the University of London
People educated at Colchester County High School
People from Walthamstow
People from Sutton Coldfield
British socialist feminists
Labour Party (UK) councillors
21st-century British women politicians
People of Anglo-Irish descent
UK MPs 2019–present
Women councillors in England